Abraham "Appie" Bueno de Mesquita (July 23, 1918 in Amsterdam – August 19, 2005 in Lelystad) was a Dutch comedian, actor and stage artist, well known for his ability to make funny faces.

In World War II, Bueno de Mesquita was imprisoned in the Dossin Barracks in Mechelen, Belgium on account of being Sephardi Jewish, and was scheduled to be deported to Auschwitz. However, the camp commander was looking for musicians. His ability to play a one string cello combined with his mimical talents saved his life.

Bueno de Mesquita was one of the first television artists, starring on-screen as early as 1952, Bueno de Mesquita appeared on television as a comedian. In 1968, he started working with Rudi Carrell on German television, which he continued doing for 13 seasons. Since his name was hard to pronounce for many Germans, he was known as "the small one with the moustache". He has stated that his success in making Germans laugh sometimes felt like a small revenge.

He wrote an autobiography titled Cello met één snaar (Cello with one string).

After a long illness with lung cancer and a brain tumor, Bueno de Mesquita died on August 18/19, 2005, in his hometown of Lelystad at the age of 87.

External links
 
 
 Varieté-artiest Bueno de Mesquita overleden (Dutch)

1918 births
2005 deaths
20th-century Sephardi Jews
21st-century Sephardi Jews
Deaths from brain cancer in the Netherlands
Deaths from lung cancer in the Netherlands
Dutch male film actors
Dutch Sephardi Jews
Dutch television personalities
Jewish Dutch comedians
Male actors from Amsterdam
Nazi concentration camp survivors